The Mantram Handbook describes methods of using a mantram — sometimes called a Holy Name — in daily living. Benefits are also described. Written by Eknath Easwaran, the book was originally published in the United States in 1977. Several subsequent editions have been published, sometimes under different titles, in the United States, the United Kingdom, and India. Foreign (non-English) editions have also been published in several languages. The book has been reviewed in newspapers, magazines, and websites, and discussed in professional journals. It has also been a focus of scientific research. The subtitle of the fifth (2008) US edition is: a practical guide to choosing your mantram & calming your mind.

Topics covered

Easwaran's Mantram Handbook provides an introduction to the practice of repeating mantrams and/or holy names, terms the author uses interchangeably. The book offers the author's practical guidance for choosing a mantram and using it for personal centering and spiritual growth. In the opening chapters, the author recommends selecting a single mantram (such as those in the table at right), and suggests that the reader "take your time choosing a mantram..... then, once you have chosen a mantram, do not change it." Most of the remainder of the book discusses how to integrate the mantram into daily living to improve skills and solve various types of problems. Late in the book, Easwaran describes how the mantram can be combined with other spiritual practices, such as meditation. Easwaran's approach is distinctive, in that he recommends a method of sitting meditation that does not focus on the mantram. Accordingly, the entire concern of the Mantram Handbook is in how to use a mantram throughout the day, at times apart from sitting meditation.

With only slight variation, each edition of the Mantram Handbook has contained the same 12 major parts:

The most recent (5th) US edition contains a foreword by Daniel H. Lowenstein. Offering perspectives as a neurologist and medical educator, Lowenstein states that

The book also contains an index.

Reviews and influence
Reviews of the Mantram Handbook have appeared in 
The Hindu,
Business Standard (India),
The Economic Times (India),
The B.C. Catholic,
the Pacific Sun,
Cosmos (Australia),
Medical Self-Care,
Journal of Ecumenical Studies,
Journal of Psychology and Christianity,
Journal of Transpersonal Psychology,
and Booklist.
The Mantram Handbook has also been discussed in books authored by Andrew Weil, in books edited by Thomas G. Plante and J. Harold Ellens, and on websites such as Spirituality and Health.

Andrew Weil stated that the Mantram Handbook "is the only book I have seen on the use of mantram as a centering technique."

In the Business Standard, Apratim Barua wrote that 
Mantram Handbook... is concise, simple and practical.... Where Easwaran scores over other books of a similar type is in his non-sectarian approach and his appeal to common-sense.... Second, Easwaran's account is deeply personal and, therefore, all the more convincing. He has traversed the same path himself and is aware of all the snares and pitfalls. The tone of the book is cheerful, optimistic and positive.... The book is not merely about mantrams. Its aim is the cultivation of a more wholesome and positive approach to life.

In the Journal of Psychology and Christianity, Doug Oman and Joseph Driskill wrote that
For people of any religious faith or none, Easwaran offers a highly practical yet consistently spiritual discussion of integrating a holy name into daily modern living. Presenting the most comprehensive practical discussion of how to draw upon a holy name throughout the day in a variety of ordinary and challenging situations, this book is also uniquely universal as a resource for professionals working with diverse populations.

In The Hindu, Anita Joshua wrote that 
Knowing full well the potential of the mantram in releasing new and positive energy that can help chase away seemingly incurable problems, Eknath Easwaran took upon himself the task of explaining it in the most simplest of terms and the way it works on the human system. And, at the outset itself, he explains that mantram is not exclusive to the Hindu religion.... He signs off by explaining how the mantram relates to a large body of spiritual disciplines ... [and] is particularly careful to differentiate such spiritual disciplines from dogmas.

Also in The Hindu, M. P. Pandit wrote that as an
exponent of Eastern spiritual disciplines in the university circles in the West, Eknath Easwaran has evolved a style that makes abstruse concepts simple and appealing.... The author refutes the charge that the practice of mantra is self-hypnosis. It is not that any word repeated for a length of time will have the same results.... he explains mantra as 'that which enables us to cross the sea of the mind.' Actually the traditional derivation is mananat trayate, helps to cross the ocean of samsara.

The Economic Times (India) wrote that "Easwaran strips the mystery off the mantram and explains how it can help us gain the will and insight to refashion our lives":
The method Easwaran suggests is simple: pick a mantram of 'proven power' recommended by the great spiritual teachers of any religion that you follow. Easwaran makes no attempt to avoid references to religion and the aim of his technique is, in fact, to take one closer to God. Claims Easwaran: "Constant repetition and practice is required for the mantram to take root in our consciousness and gradually transform it, just as constant repetition makes the advertiser's jingle stick in our minds."... Even a sceptic could benefit from the solutions Easwaran puts forward.

In the Journal of Ecumenical Studies, E. James Baesler noted that "several of the eastern Christian and eastern Hindu traditions recommend reciting the Holy Name outside the predetermined prayer periods." Most also 
recommend reciting the Holy Name during a time set apart exclusively for prayer.... The one exception to this pattern is Easwaran's [Mantram Handbook] recommendation to recite the Holy Name at virtually all times except the time set apart for meditation/prayer. Easwaran's rationale... is that meditation times are for... the repetition of an inspirational passage, while repeating the [mantram] does not require as much discipline and thus can be 'prayed' anytime.
In the Journal of Transpersonal Psychology, Thomas Weide wrote that "for a so-called handbook, the book mentions surprisingly few different mantrams, and omits much material commonly covered by mantram advocates." But Weide recommended the book "highly to the total transpersonal public, not just to mantram lovers,"  stating that
Easwaran writes with lovely simplicity about how to live a more spiritual life in general, and.... gives a splendid explanation of how mantrams work, how to choose one, and above all, how to work on oneself in general, using a mantram merely as one of several important practices.

Similarly, Apratim Barua (quoted above) expressed concern that "The title is a slight misnomer. The book is not merely about mantrams.... If anything, the number of mantrams discussed is woefully inadequate. He takes up some four in all [sic], one from each major religion.... This may be due to the fact that the aim of the book is the cultivation of a more wholesome and positive approach to life."

In Medical Self-Care, Thomas Ferguson wrote that the Mantram Handbook described "how mantrams work, how to choose one, and how to use it... Spiritual, non-sectarian, quietly delightful." Booklist wrote that "This guide by a Hindu expert on religions is refreshingly real. He also contradicts popular misconceptions about mantrams and gives practical advice."

Sections of the book have been excerpted.<ref
  name=mh-chinmaya90>Eknath Easwaran (1991). "Interrelationship of spiritual disciplines." In </ref>

Research
The Mantram Handbook was the primary instructional text in several research studies on mantram repetition conducted through the Veterans Administration in San Diego, California, by Jill Bormann and her colleagues. Randomized trials that she led have reported benefits from mantram repetition that include higher quality of life, increased use of positive strategies of coping with stress, gains in faith/assurance and spiritual connectedness, and reductions in psychological distress, PTSD symptoms, and anger. Additional research findings offered evidence linking mantram use with reduced stress, anxiety, anger, and PTSD symptoms, as well as increased quality of life and spiritual well-being, and documenting that study participants found mantram repetition useful for managing stress, emotions, sleep/insomnia, and unwanted thoughts. The Mantram Handbook was also cited as a main source in developing a mantram-centered intervention for nurses in Korea. The intervention was found to reduce burnout, and to enhance well-being, spiritual integrity, and leadership practice.

Editions
All US editions have been published by Nilgiri Press, which also published the original 1977 edition. Non-English editions in translation have been published in Bahasa Indonesian,<ref
    name=bahasa02>Eknath Easwaran (2002). Sayap-Sayap Rajawali ("Eagles Wings"). Jakarta, Indonesia:  PT Gramedia  (225 pages)</ref>
Czech,<ref
    name=czech18>Eknath Easwaran (2018). Osobní mantra: jak si zvolit vlastní mantru a využít ji k transformaci mysli ("Personal mantra: how to choose your own mantra and use it to transform your mind") (Karin Heřmanská, trans.). Prague [Praha], Czech Republic: Elfa   (181 pages)</ref>
Dutch,<ref
    name=dutch02>Eknath Easwaran (2002). Het mantrahandboek (Mantram handbook) (W. J. van Maarschalkerweerd-Bakker, trans.). BRES Publishing.  (189 pages)</ref>
German, 
German,<ref
   name=german89>Eknath Easwaran (1989). Mantram, Hilfe durch die Kraft des Wortes (Mantram: Help through the power of the word) Freiburg im Breisgau: Bauer Hermann Verlag. ,  (255 pages)</ref>
Hungarian,
Italian,
Korean, Lithuanian,
Spanish,
and Telugu.

English-language editions have been published in the United States, the United Kingdom and India. The US editions are:

A British edition:

Two Indian editions:

References

External links
Mantram research studies (list, description, links)
(at UCSF, by Daniel Lowenstein, author of Foreword to Mantram Handbook, 5th ed.)

1977 non-fiction books
2008 non-fiction books
Books about spirituality
Devotional literature
Mantras
Mysticism texts
Meditation
Prayer
Works by Eknath Easwaran